Robert Rutherford (4 October 1886 – 17 August 1960) was a New Zealand cricketer. He played nine first-class matches for Otago between 1908 and 1914.

See also
 List of Otago representative cricketers

References

External links
 

1886 births
1960 deaths
New Zealand cricketers
Otago cricketers
Cricketers from Dunedin